is a Japanese yuri  and shōjo manga writer and artist. 

Her work focuses on relationships between lesbian women on various stages of life. Some themes of her manga are first love and first relationships, facing being lesbian, discovering lesbian relationships, closeting, workplace relationships, age gap and long-term lesbian relationships.

Works
The Conditions of Paradise (2007) (1 volume)
Hanjuku Joshi (2008 – 2009) (2 volumes)
Seigakuin Kōka Daigaku Yakan-bu (2009)
The Conditions of Paradise: Azure Dreams (2009) (1 volume)
Renai Joshika (2010 – 2011) (2 volumes)
Renai Joshi File
The Conditions of Paradise: Our First Time (2013) (1 volume)
Onna no ko Awase (2013) (1 volume)
Yurikuma Arashi (2014 – 2016, art)
Motto Hanjuku Joshi (2017 – ongoing)

References

External links 

 
 

1973 births
Japanese female comics artists
Female comics writers
Living people
Manga artists from Tokyo
Women manga artists
Yuri (genre)
21st-century Japanese women writers